Aloe nuttii is a species of aloe native to Tanzania and neighboring countries.

The mature flowers are cooked and used as a vegetable, often in combination with peas or pumpkin leaves.

References

Flora of Tanzania
Flora of Malawi
Flora of Zambia
Flora of the Democratic Republic of the Congo
Flora of Angola
Inflorescence vegetables
nuttii